Kemi-Tornio sub-region is a subdivision of Finnish Lapland and, since 2009, one of the sub-regions of Finland.

Municipalities
 Kemi
 Keminmaa
 Simo
 Tervola
 Tornio

Politics
Results of the 2018 Finnish presidential election:

 Sauli Niinistö   50.6%
 Paavo Väyrynen   20.8%
 Laura Huhtasaari   7.6%
 Pekka Haavisto   7.2%
 Matti Vanhanen   5.5%
 Merja Kyllönen   5.4%
 Tuula Haatainen   2.6%
 Nils Torvalds   0.3%

Sub-regions of Finland
Lapland (Finland)